Goshorn Lake is a small inland lake near Saugatuck, Michigan, named after James Goshorn. It is separated by high sand dunes from the Lake Michigan shore and was once a meeting place for the Pottawatomi Native Americans.

References

Lane, Kit, Goshorn Lake Remembered, Pavilion Press (2000)

External links
 Goshorn Lake Remembered Amazon.com book summary
 57 second video of Goshorn Lake

Lakes of Allegan County, Michigan
Lakes of Michigan